Robert Grubb (born 31 January 1950) is an Australian actor. He studied acting at  National Institute of Dramatic Art (NIDA), where he graduated in 1978. There he was a fellow student of actor Mel Gibson.

Grubb played the role of Dr. Geoffrey Standish in the popular series The Flying Doctors. He won Australia's Helpmann Award for Best Male Actor in a Supporting Role in a Musical for his stage portrayal of Pop in the Australian production of the Queen musical, We Will Rock You.

In 1998, he played The Wolf/Cinderella’s Prince in Sondheim’s Into the Woods

He also narrated "Rainforest Beneath the Canopy" in 2004.

 Grubb was reprising his previous role of Detective Bill Graves on Neighbours.

Grubb features as Senior Sgt Bill Kirby in Savage River (TV series), on  ABC TV  (and  iview), premiering September 2022 and set in country Victoria.

Selected filmography

References

External links
 

1950 births
Living people
Australian male film actors
Australian male stage actors
Australian male television actors
Helpmann Award winners
Male actors from Hobart
National Institute of Dramatic Art alumni